The San José Public Library is the public library system of San Jose, California, made up of 23 branch libraries spread across the city.

Organization
Its central library, Dr. Martin Luther King Jr. Library, is also the main library of the San Jose State University. Built in 2003, King Library is the first joint use library in the United States shared by a major university as its only library and a large city as its main library. It has more than 1.6 million items.

The city has 23 neighborhood branches including the Biblioteca Latinoamericana which specializes in Spanish language materials. The East San Jose Carnegie Branch Library, a Carnegie library opened in 1908, is the last Carnegie library in Santa Clara County still operating as a public library and is listed in the National Register of Historic Places.  As the result of a bond measure passed in November 2000, a number of brand new or completely reconstructed branches have been completed and opened.

The San Jose system (along with the university system) were jointly named as "Library of the Year" by Library Journal in 2004.

Branches 

 Dr. Martin Luther King, Jr. Library
 Almaden
 Alviso
 Dr. Roberto Cruz – Alum Rock
 Bascom
 Berryessa
 Biblioteca Latinoamericana
 Cambrian
 Calabazas
 East S.J. Carnegie
 Educational Park
 Edenvale
 Evergreen
 Hillview
 Joyce Ellington
 Mt. Pleasant
 Pearl Avenue
 Rose Garden
 Santa Teresa
 Seven Trees
 Tully Community
 Village Square
 Vineland
 Willow Glen
 West Valley

See also 

 Santa Clara County Library District

References

External links 

 

Public libraries in California
Government of San Jose, California
Education in San Jose, California
Organizations based in San Jose, California
Libraries in Santa Clara County, California